Tania Bambaci (born 11 August 1990 in Barcellona Pozzo di Gotto, Sicily, Italy) is an Italian actress, fashion model and beauty pageant titleholder who was the winner of the Miss Mondo Italia 2011 pageant that was held in Gallipoli, Apulia, on 11 June 2011. On 6 November of that year she represented Italy at the Miss World 2011 pageant in London, Great Britain, where she was placed in the Top 15.

Before Miss World, Tania had entered the Miss Italia 2010 pageant as Miss Sicilia, placing among the Top 10. Previously, she had won the Italian pageant Una Ragazza per il Cinema in 2008.

Tania has a degree in "foreign languages and literatures" and in 2019 has got a master in "Screenwriting and Audiovisual production".

Partial filmography

Cinema 
 Paranormal Stories (2011)
 Tra la vita e la morte (2013)
 The Perfect Husband  (2014)
 Mission Possible (2018)
 Picciridda - Con i piedi nella sabbia (2020)
 Governance - Il prezzo del potere (2021)
 L'altra Luna (2021)

 Television 
 Cacciatore: The Hunter'' (2018)

References

External links
 

1990 births
Living people
People from Barcellona Pozzo di Gotto
Italian female models
Italian beauty pageant winners
Miss World 2011 delegates
Actors from the Province of Messina
Models from Sicily
21st-century Italian actresses